A Prescription for the Blues is an album by jazz pianist Horace Silver released on the Impulse! label in 1997 featuring performances by Silver with Randy Brecker, Michael Brecker, Ron Carter, and Louis Hayes.

Reception 

The Allmusic review by Scott Yanow awarded the album 4 stars and states: "The funny part about Silver's music is that, no matter who he is paying tribute to (this set includes a song for Lester Young), the style always ends up sounding like Horace Silver, with no real reference to the subject matter... But it is a joy to hear Horace Silver still playing in his prime at the age of 68."

Track listing
All compositions by Horace Silver
 "A Prescription for the Blues" – 5:12
 "Whenever Lester Plays the Blues" – 6:35
 "You Gotta Shake That Thing" – 5:16
 "Yodel Lady Blues" – 6:42
 "Brother John and Brother Gene" – 4:43
 "Free at Last" – 6:27
 "Walk On" – 6:26
 "Sunrise in Malibu" – 5:01
 "Doctor Jazz" – 5:31
 Recorded in NYC on May 29 & 30, 1997.

Personnel
Horace Silver – piano
Randy Brecker – trumpet
Michael Brecker – tenor saxophone
Ron Carter – bass
Louis Hayes – drums

References

Horace Silver albums
1997 albums
Impulse! Records albums